Leptosphinctes is an extinct genus from a well-known class of fossil cephalopods, the ammonites. It lived during the Jurassic Period, which lasted from approximately 200 to 145 million years ago.

Distribution
Jurassic deposits of British Columbia, Egypt, Hungary, Iran, Mexico, Poland, Saudi Arabia and Spain.

References

Jurassic ammonites
Ammonites of Europe